Statue of Enrique Díaz de León may refer to:

 Statue of Enrique Díaz de León (Rotonda de los Jaliscienses Ilustres), Guadalajara, Jalisco, Mexico
 Statue of Enrique Díaz de León (University of Guadalajara), Guadalajara, Jalisco, Mexico